Hollister Hill is a mountain located in the Catskill Mountains of New York north of Delhi. Big Tom is located north, and Betts Hill is located east of Calhoun Hill.

References

Mountains of Delaware County, New York
Mountains of New York (state)